Major (R) Mohammad Aamir Khan better known as Major Amir, is a Pakistani analyst, Afghan affairs specialist and former officer of a secret agency ISI. He is known for the Operation Midnight Jackal.

Amir was born to Muhammad Tahir Panjpiri in a religious family of Panjpir a town in Swabi District.

Operation Midnight Jackal 

Both Brig. Ahmed and Major Amir were discharged from their military commissions in 1989. The inquiry remains classified since it is still unclear who the real culprit behind the plot was, or was it under the instructions of the DG ISI Shamsur Rahman Kallu.

References

Pakistan Army officers
People from Swabi District
Living people
Year of birth missing (living people)